Singapore Changi Airport, commonly known as Changi Airport , is a major international airport that serves Singapore, and is one of the largest transportation hubs in Asia. As one of the world's busiest airports by international passenger and cargo traffic, it has been rated as the "World's Best Airport" by Skytrax a dozen times, and currently holds the title, and was the first airport in the world to hold the accolade for eight consecutive years. It has also been rated as one of the world's cleanest airports and highly rated international transit airports. More than 100 airlines operate from the airport, with nonstop or direct flights to destinations in Asia, Oceania, Africa, Europe, the Middle East, and North America.

It is the home base of BOC Aviation and Jetstar Asia Airways, as well as the country's flag carrier of Singapore Airlines, its cargo division Singapore Airlines Cargo and its low-cost subsidiary Scoot. SATS is also headquartered at the airport.

With Singapore's strategic location being a favourable destination for high demand layovers, the airport also serves as a focus city for Qantas, as well as the flagship cargo hub for FedEx Express in Asia. In 2019, Changi Airport served 68.3 million passengers, making it the 18th busiest airport in the world. The airport is operated by Changi Airport Group, a wholly-owned subsidiary under the purview of the Ministry of Finance of the Government of Singapore. A fifth mega-terminal is currently under construction.

History

Conception
Prior to Changi, Singapore's main international airport was located at Paya Lebar. It had opened in 1955 with a single runway and a small passenger terminal, having itself replaced the previous Kallang Airport that began operations in 1937. The decision to move the airport from Paya Lebar to Changi was based on a number of factors. With the growth in global aviation transport, the airport was facing congestion problems. Its inability to cope with the rising traffic became critical by the 1970s; annual passenger numbers rose dramatically from 300,000 in 1955 to 1.7 million in 1970 and to 4 million in 1975. As a result, there was a need to accommodate the growing demand for air travel, the desire to establish Singapore as a global aviation hub, and the need to modernise the country's air transport infrastructure.

The Singaporean government had two options – expand the existing airport at Paya Lebar or build a new airport at another location. After extensive studies, a decision was made in 1972 to keep the airport at Paya Lebar, as recommended by aviation consultants. Plans were made for the building of a second runway and an extensive redevelopment and expansion to the passenger terminal building. A year later, however, the plans were reviewed again as the pressure to expand the airport eased because of the 1973 oil crisis.

Concerned that the existing airport was located in an area with potential for urban growth, which would physically hem it in on all sides, the government subsequently decided in 1975 to build a new airport at the eastern tip of the main island at Changi, at the existing site of Changi Air Base. However, as there was an increase in traffic, the airport still had to be expanded at that time. In addition, aircraft could fly over the sea, avoiding noise pollution issues within residential areas and avoid disastrous consequences on the ground in the event of an air mishap. Fomerly known as the Singapore International Airport, the airport in Paya Lebar was subsequently converted for military use and renamed as Paya Lebar Air Base.

Construction
The original master plan for Changi Airport involved constructing a dual-terminal and dual-runway configuration over two phases with provisions for another two passenger terminals in the future. Phase 1 included the construction for the first passenger terminal, the first runway reusing and upgrading the main runway of Changi Air Base, 45 aircraft parking bays, support facilities and structures, including a large maintenance hangar, a fire station, workshops and administrative offices, an airfreight complex, two cargo agents buildings, in-flight catering kitchens and an  control tower. Construction for the second phase would commence immediately after the completion of Phase 1 and include the second runway, 23 new aircraft parking bays in addition to the existing 45 bays, a second fire station and a third cargo agent building.

Changi Airport would begin commencing commercial operations on 1 July 1981. It officially opened five months later on 29 December 1981. The airport ended its first year operations with 12.1 million passengers, close to 200,000 tonnes of air freight handled and 63,100 aircraft movements. Subsequent phases opened progressively within the next few decades, with Terminal 2 opening for passenger traffic in 1990, Terminal 3 in 2008, and Terminal 4 in 2017. Terminal 5, which would be larger than all the previous terminals combined, is expected to open in 2030.

Overview

Changi Airport serves more than 100 airlines flying to 400 cities in around 100 countries and territories worldwide, as of November 2020. About 7,400 flights arrive or depart at Changi each week, or one every 80 seconds.

For the 2019 full-year figures published by the airport, the airport handled 68,300,000 passengers (a 4.0% increase over the previous year), the most in its 38-year history. This made it the seventh busiest airport by international passenger traffic in the world and the third busiest in Asia. In December 2019, Changi Airport registered a total of 6.41 million passenger movements, the highest the airport has ever achieved in a month since it opened in 1981. Its daily traffic movement record was also broken on 20 December 2019, with 226,692 passengers passing through during that day. In addition to being an important passenger hub, the airport is also one of the busiest cargo airports in the world, handling 2.01 million tonnes of cargo in 2019. The total number of commercial aircraft movements decreased by 1.0% from the previous year to 382,000 in 2019.

The airport has won over 620 awards since its opening, including 28 "Best Airport" awards in 2019 alone. Changi Airport's efforts to mitigate the effects of ageing infrastructure include continual physical upgrades to its existing terminals and building new facilities to maintain its high standards in airport service quality.

Passenger terminals
Changi Airport has four main passenger terminals arranged in an elongated inverted "U" shape with Jewel in the centre of the "U" shape. Currently, the airport has a designed total annual handling capacity of 85 million passengers.

There is also a privately run luxury terminal called the JetQuay CIP Terminal. It is similar to the Lufthansa First Class Terminal at Frankfurt Airport, but is open to all passengers travelling in all classes on all airlines with an access fee.

The short-lived Budget Terminal was opened on 26 March 2006 and closed on 25 September 2012 to make way for Terminal 4.

Mixed-use development

Jewel Changi Airport, which opened on 17 April 2019, is a nature-themed entertainment and retail complex interconnecting Terminals 1, 2 and 3. Announced in 2013, it was a new terminal structure that is intended to be a mixed-use complex. It is situated on a 3.5-hectare site where the Terminal 1 car park used to reside. Jewel was developed by Jewel Changi Airport Trustee Pte Ltd, a joint venture between Changi Airport Group and CapitaLand, through its wholly owned shopping mall business, CapitaLand Mall Asia. The project cost S$1.7 billion.
Part of this project was planned to help expand Terminal 1 to handle 24 million passengers per year by 2018. The Indoor Waterfall (named "Rain Vortex") in the structure holds the World Record for the Tallest indoor waterfall in the world.

Future terminals and projects
Terminal 5 is anticipated to be operational by the mid-2030s, to meet an anticipated doubling of volume by the 2040s. It is expected to handle 50 million passenger movements per annum. The airport terminal structure is projected to be larger than all the previous terminals combined. It will be built on reclaimed land to the east of the present terminals. It will be partially funded through an increased levy. KPF Singapore with Heatherwick Studio, Architects 61, and DP Architects will provide architectural services. Arup Singapore, Mott MacDonald Singapore and Surbana Jurong Consultants will provide engineering services. The former Transport Minister Khaw Boon Wan said that the Changi Terminal 5 project was delayed by at least 2 years as a result of the COVID-19 pandemic.

Operations

Passenger operations
As the airport only handles international passenger traffic, all terminals in operation are equipped with immigration-processing facilities for international travel.

After recovering from a drop in passenger traffic as a result of the September 11 attacks in 2001 and the Severe Acute Respiratory Syndrome (SARS) epidemic in 2003, the airport saw rapid growth in traffic, which hit the 30-million mark for the first time in 2004. In March 2008, prior to the full effect of the financial crisis of 2007–2010 on the global economy, the airport was predicted to handle 50 million passengers by 2012 due to the opening of casinos in Singapore and the phased liberalisation of the Asean aviation sector. As predicted, the airport surpassed the 50-million mark in 2012.

On 18 December 2017, the airport surpassed the 60-million mark for the first time. The airport saw a record 65.6 million passenger movements in 2018 – beating 2017's record of 60 million passengers with a 5.5 per cent increase.

In 2019, Firefly, the sole turboprop operator in Changi Airport, moved to Seletar Airport to make way for their jet operations.

Due to the COVID-19 pandemic, passenger traffic fell in 2020 and 2021, resulting in Terminals 2 and 4 closing temporarily in May 2020. Terminals 1 and 3 remained open for passengers throughout, but were closed to the general public on 12 May 2021 along with Jewel, reopening on 1 September 2021.

Cargo Division
The Air Cargo Division of the Changi Airport Group (CAG) manages the Changi Airfreight Centre located in the north of the airport premises. The airport handled 1.81 million tonnes of air cargo in 2012, making it the 7th busiest airfreight hub in the world and the fifth busiest in Asia. Due to Singapore's large electronics sector, electrical components constitute a significant part of the total cargo traffic handled at the airport. Changi airport has initiated attempts to expand into the perishable air cargo market. In 2015, Changi Airport handled 1,853,087 tonnes of air freight. Air Cargo World awarded the 2013 Air Cargo Excellence Award to Changi Airport for handling more than 1,000,000 tonnes of cargo in Asia.

The airport handled 2,006,300 tonnes of cargo in 2016, making it the 13th top cargo airport in the world and the sixth in the Asia Pacific region.

In 2017, the airport handled 2,125,226 tonnes of cargo. The top five cargo markets for the airport were China, Australia, Hong Kong, United States and India.

Key markets and destinations
In 2018, Indonesia was the largest market for the airport, followed by Malaysia, China, Thailand, Australia, India, Hong Kong, Japan, Philippines and Vietnam. Kuala Lumpur was the top destination for travellers in the airport, followed by Bangkok, Jakarta, Hong Kong, Manila, Denpasar, Tokyo, Ho Chi Minh City, Taipei and Sydney.

Safety and security

The Changi Airport Group (CAG) manages the overall safety and security of the airport. The Airport Management Division of the CAG manages the customer aspects of the airport's security, while the Aviation Security Unit oversees the airport's compliance with aviation security (AVSEC) policies, and manages AVSEC-related projects. The airport's emergency and fire-fighting services are handled by the Airport Emergency Service Division. The Airport Emergency Services handles all instances of rescue and fire-fighting within the airport premises as well as in surrounding waters. It operates from two main fire stations (Station 1 by Runway 1 along West Perimeter Road and Station 2 by Runway 2), one sub-station (Domestic Fire Station), and one sea rescue base near the airport.

The airport's security comes under the regulatory purview of the Airport Police Division of the Singapore Police Force (SPF). The day to day discharge of security functions at the airport is performed by auxiliary police forces including Aetos Security Management, Certis CISCO and SATS Security Services. Aetos and SATS Security Services are affiliated to the ground handling companies of Dnata and Singapore Changi Airport Terminal Services respectively. On 29 April 2008, CAAS signed its then-biggest single security contract for all airport-related security services by engaging Certis CISCO to provide security services at Singapore Changi Airport, as well as Seletar Airport, Changi Airfreight Centre, and the Singapore Air Traffic Control Centre. It involves the deployment of about 2,600 Certis Cisco personnel, including armed Auxiliary Police Officers and unarmed aviation security officers to perform tasks such as screening checked baggage, controlling access to restricted areas, and screening passengers before they board their aircraft.

Since the September 11 attacks and the naming of the airport as a terrorist target by the Jemaah Islamiyah, the airport's security has been tightened. Singapore Armed Forces and Singapore Police Force officers, armed with assault rifles or sub-machine guns, have been deployed to patrol the terminals at random intervals. Officers from the Gurkha Contingent are also dispatched to patrol the transit areas of the terminal buildings. These measures come at a cost partly borne by travellers in the form of a "passenger security service charge", imposed since 2002.

In 2005, an upgrade in screening technology and rising security concerns led to luggage-screening processes being conducted behind closed doors, as opposed to them being done before check-in within public view. The screening of carry-on luggage and travellers are mostly conducted at individual departure gates, while check-in luggage is screened in the backrooms and secured before loading. A perimeter intrusion detection system for Changi Airport's perimeter fence has also been put in place to further strengthen the security of the airfield, while a biometric access control system for staff movement has been put in place since 2006.

Airlines and destinations

Passenger
The following list consists of the regular scheduled and charter flights to and from Changi Airport.

Cargo

Operational statistics 

The cause of the sudden plummet in 2020 numbers is a result of the COVID-19 pandemic.

Accidents and incidents
 On 26 March 1991, Singapore Airlines Flight 117, operated by an Airbus A310, was hijacked by four Pakistani terrorists. The flight landed in Changi Airport at 22:15. The Singapore Special Operations Force stormed the aircraft, on the morning of 27 March. All four hijackers were killed, with only minor injuries among the 123 passengers and crew that were held hostage for more than eight hours.
 On 4 November 2010, Qantas Flight 32, operated by an Airbus A380-800, suffered an uncontained engine failure and made an emergency landing at Changi Airport. Upon landing, one of the engines could not be shut down due to ruptured control cables and had to be doused for three hours by airport firefighters to forcefully shut it down. There were no crew or passenger injuries, and all 469 people on board survived this incident.
 On 27 June 2016, Singapore Airlines Flight 368, a scheduled service from Changi Airport to Milan, Italy carrying 222 passengers and 19 crew, caught fire shortly after it landed. Approximately three hours into the flight, the Boeing 777 turned back after the pilot received an engine oil warning message. Shortly after landing, the right engine and wing were ablaze, with flames engulfing the right side of the jet. No one was injured. 
 On 16 May 2017, a fire broke out at the departure hall in Terminal 2. The fire caused 40 flights at Terminal 2 to be delayed and diverted to Terminal 3. Terminal 2 was closed from 17:30 to 22:45.
 On 29 November 2017, a tow tug towing a Singapore Airlines aircraft caught fire. This fire was promptly put out by the airport's emergency services. A member of the towing crew was in the aircraft's cockpit when the fire occurred; this crew member evacuated through the aircraft's emergency slides.
 On 6 February 2018, a KAI T-50 Golden Eagle, part of the Black Eagles aerobatic team taking part in Singapore Airshow 2018, veered off the runway during takeoff and crashed. The resulting fire was put out by emergency services and the pilot was treated for minor injuries. Runway 1 was closed as a result and caused delays at the airport.

Ground transportation
Changi Airport was built with ground-transportation considerations in mind from the onset, with the East Coast Parkway beginning at the Benjamin Sheares Bridge built and opened in tandem with the airport, providing a direct link to the city centre.

Despite the four main passenger terminal buildings being relatively close to each other, the CAAS (Civil Aviation Authority of Singapore) decided to build the Changi Airport Skytrain people-mover system to facilitate quicker and more convenient transfers between the terminals for travellers. The system was upgraded in 2007 with new technologies supplied by Mitsubishi, connecting to Terminal 3 and separating checked-in passengers from the general public on distinct tracks.

Inter-terminal transportation

Terminals 1, 2 and 3 are connected by the free Skytrain service, which operates from 05:00 to 02:30. During non-operational hours, travellers in the transit areas may transfer within the terminals by foot via the inter-terminal travelators. For travellers in the public areas, a free shuttle bus service will connect the three terminals.

A complimentary 24-hour Airport Shuttle Bus service plies between Terminal 3 and Terminal 4 in both the public and transit areas. The journey takes approximately eight to 10 minutes.

External connections

Mass Rapid Transit
The airport is connected to the Mass Rapid Transit (MRT) network via a two-stop branch of the East West line from Tanah Merah MRT station, consisting of two stations: Expo, serving the nearby Singapore Expo site; and Changi Airport. Changi Airport MRT station is located underground between Terminal 2 and Terminal 3. Direct, one-train service to the downtown and western parts of Singapore was initially in operation when the station opened on 8 February 2002. This was replaced by the current shuttle service between Tanah Merah and Changi Airport via Expo on 22 July 2003, when it was found that passenger demand for this route was low.

As announced in the LTA's Land Transport Masterplan, the new Thomson–East Coast line will be extended to Changi Airport Terminal 5 and to the current Changi Airport station, with the current EWL Branch line being converted to be part of the TEL.

Bus
There are seven bus services operated by SBS Transit, SMRT Buses, Tower Transit Singapore and Go-Ahead Singapore, making a loop starting from Terminal 3 to Terminal 1, and Terminal 2. Only four bus services will continue to Terminal 4Services 24, 34, 36 and 110. Bus stops are located at the basement bus bays of Terminals 1, 2 and 3. For Terminal 4, the bus stop is located next to Car Park 4B.

Coaches to and from Johor Bahru are also available. Operated by Transtar Travel, the TS1 service will start at coach stands of Terminals 1, 2, and 3, and end at Larkin Terminal.

There is also a free shuttle bus service plying between Changi Airport (T3) and Changi Business Park. This service is a nine-stop route, running from Mondays to Fridays, except public holidays.

Taxis
Taxis are available at taxi stands located in the arrival halls of each terminal. There is an additional airport surcharge for all trips originating from the airport. Limousine and other transportation options are available at the Ground Transport Concierge.

Private transportation
All pick-ups by private transportation occur at the arrival pick-up points of each terminal. Car rental counters are located in the arrival halls of each terminal.

By foot or bicycle
A new  Changi Airport Connector, which opened on 11 October 2020, links the airport to East Coast Park. Bicycle rental services are available along with other facilities such as pay-per-use showers and bicycle lockers at HUB & SPOKE Changi Airport. Admission is free.

See also

Airport Logistics Park
History of Singapore Changi Airport
Infrastructure of Singapore Changi Airport
Jewel Changi Airport
Kinetic Rain

References

Notes

Citations

Bibliography
 , illustrated description of the newly opened Singapore Airport

External links

 Singapore Changi Airport official site
 Singapore Changi Airport JetQuay CIP Terminal official website
 Virtual reality view of Changi Airport Terminal 3
 360° image of Changi Airport Terminal 3
 
 

 
Changi
Airports established in 1981
1981 establishments in Singapore
20th-century architecture in Singapore